The Cayman Ridge is an undersea mountain range on the northern margin of the Cayman Trough in the Caribbean Sea. The Cayman Ridge also includes the Cayman Islands.

The ridge formed as an island arc when the Cayman Trough was the site of a subduction zone during the Paleocene and Eocene epochs. As the dynamics of the area changed, the subduction zone became a transform fault zone with a pull-apart basin during which time volcanism had dwindled along the entire length of the arc. The Cayman Ridge is now an inactive volcanic zone.

References

Underwater ridges of the Atlantic Ocean
Borders of Cuba
Geography of the Cayman Islands
Geography of Cuba
Island arcs
Paleocene volcanism
Eocene volcanism